Tenneti Viswanadham (1895–1979)  was born into Telugu speaking Brahmin family. He was a political figure from Visakhapatnam, on the east coast of India. He took an active part in India's struggle for independence. He is remembered now for his role in the establishment of a modern and shore-based steel plant at Visakhapatnam.

Political works

Viswanadham was elected to the Madras Legislative Assembly in 1937. During 1951 he served as the leader of the Opposition in the Madras Assembly. He was elected to 4th Lok Sabha from Visakhapatnam constituency. He served as the Minister for Finance and Law for Andhra State after the state was carved out of Madras Presidency.

Viswanadham successfully contested in Visakhapatnam seat to the Madras Legislative Assembly in 1952 from Kisan Mazdoor Praja Party. In 1955, he contested in Madugula and lost to Donda Sreerama Murty. In 1962, he contested for both Madugula and Visakhapatnam seats. However, he successfully won in Madugula, and lost in Visakhapatnam to Ankitam Venkata Bhanoji Rao. In 1967, he contested to both parliament and assembly from Visakhapatnam Lok Sabha constituency as well as Visakhapatnam-I Assembly constituency as an Independent candidate and successfully won both the seats.

Recognitions

A five rupee stamp in his name was released on 10 November 2004 by Department of Posts, India.

The city of Visakhapatnam has a park named after him. It also has two bronze statues erected in his memory – one was erected right in the heart of the city at Jagadamba Junction, and subsequently another was erected in the Steel Plant township 'Ukkunagaram'. The Greater Municipal Corporation  building is called 'Tenneti Bhavanam'. There is a colony  named Tenneti Nagar, in Visakhapatnam which is named after him.

References

External links

 RINL pays tributes to Tenneti Viswanadham - The Hindu

1896 births
1979 deaths
India MPs 1967–1970
Telugu politicians
Lok Sabha members from Andhra Pradesh
People from Visakhapatnam district
Gandhians
Indian National Congress politicians from Andhra Pradesh
People from Uttarandhra